Muskazine is the name of a German specialty made from almonds, spices, sugar, flour and eggs. It is produced by two cafés in Dettelbach, Germany, throughout the entire year. The biscuits look like a Saint James scallop.
It was first mentioned in Literature in 1691 and originates in southern Germany. It is also known in Austria, where it was first mentioned in 1790

See also
 List of almond dishes
 List of pastries

References

German desserts
Almond dishes